The Boiling Nuclear Superheater (BONUS) Reactor Facility, also known to the locals as "Domes", or formally as Museo Tecnologico BONUS Dr. Modesto Iriarte, is a decommissioned nuclear plant in Rincón, Puerto Rico.  It was listed on the U.S. National Register of Historic Places in 2007.

History
BONUS was a prototype whose objective was to assess the economic and technical feasibility of the integral boiling superheating concept. The construction of BONUS started in 1960, and the reactor had its first controlled nuclear chain reaction on April 13, 1964. In September 1965 full power operation was achieved with 50 MW thermal power, and steam temperatures of 900°F (482°C).

Operation of the BONUS reactor was terminated in June 1968 because of technical difficulties and the ensuing need for high-cost modifications. The Puerto Rico Water Resources Authority decommissioned the reactor between 1969 and 1970. During decommissioning, all special nuclear materials (fuel) and certain highly activated components (e.g., control rods and shims) were removed from the island to the US mainland, all piping systems were flushed, the reactor vessel and associated internal components within the biological shield were entombed in concrete and grout, and systems external to the entombment were decontaminated. Many contaminated and activated materials were placed in the main circulation pump room beneath the pressure vessel and entombed in concrete.

General decontamination of the reactor was performed with the goal of meeting unrestricted use criteria in all accessible areas of the building. Residual radioactive materials remaining in the structure were isolated or shielded to protect site visitors and workers. During subsequent years, more radioactive contamination was identified in portions of the building, and additional clean-up and shielding activities were conducted in the 1990s and early 2000s.

Operation

The reactor is one of two boiling-water superheater developed in the United States. The principle of operation is boiling water in the center of reactor (likewise BWR) and passing this steam by the rest of reactor, superheating this steam to drive a turbine generator.

References

Nuclear power stations using boiling water reactors
Historic districts on the National Register of Historic Places in Puerto Rico
Aguadilla–Isabela–San Sebastián metropolitan area
Energy infrastructure in Puerto Rico
Energy infrastructure on the National Register of Historic Places
Infrastructure on the National Register of Historic Places in Puerto Rico
Nuclear history